Altica litigata, known generally as crepe myrtle flea beetle, is a species of flea beetle in the family Chrysomelidae. Other common names include the evening primrose flea beetle and primrose willow flea beetle. It is found in Central America and North America.

References

Further reading

 
 

Alticini
Articles created by Qbugbot
Beetles described in 1910